Meghipur is a village in Bhadohi (Sant Ravidas Nagar) district of Uttar Pradesh, in India. It comes under Gyanpur taluka. It comes under Aurai Tehsil of Sant Ravidas Nagar.

Demography 
Meghipur has a total population of 3,618 people amongst 562 families. The female:male ratio of Meghipur is 1688  overall and 546 in children.

See also

Bhadohi district

References

Notes
  All demographic data is based on 2011 Census of India.

Villages in Bhadohi district